Lalabad-e Kol Kol-e Do (also Romanized as La‘lābād-e Kol Kol-e Do; also known as Mīr ‘Abd ol Bāqī) is a village in Mahidasht Rural District, Mahidasht District, Kermanshah County, Kermanshah Province, Iran. At the 2006 census, its population was 81, in 18 families.

References 

Populated places in Kermanshah County